Rachid Maâtar (born January 27, 1959) is a football manager and former player. He is currently the manager of Nancy's reserve team.

Born in France, Maâtar was an Algerian international, playing at the 1988 African Cup of Nations.

References

1959 births
1988 African Cup of Nations players
Algerian footballers
Algerian football managers
Algeria international footballers
Angoulême Charente FC players
AS Béziers Hérault (football) players
AS Nancy Lorraine players
French footballers
French football managers
French sportspeople of Algerian descent
Ligue 1 players
Ligue 2 players
Sportspeople from Nancy, France
Living people
Association football midfielders
FC Metz non-playing staff
Footballers from Grand Est